Patsy Ann "Pat" McLaughlin (27 May 1932 – 4 April 2011), was an American carcinologist and was regarded as being one of the most influential scientists in her field. The crab genus Patagurus was named in her honor in 2013.

Early life and education 
McLaughlin was born in Seattle on the 27th of May 1932 to Edna Pearl Lessenger and Elmer Robert McLaughlin. She attended both Palo Alto Junior and Senior High School and graduated in 1946. She went on to attend both the University of Utah and the University of Washington, but did not obtain a degree. After serving in the United States Air Force McLaughlin returned to tertiary education again attending the University of Washington, Seattle where Dixie Lee Ray encouraged her to consider studying the natural sciences. In 1957 McLaughlin, majoring in zoology, obtained a Bachelor of Arts degree. McLaughlin went on to obtain her PhD. from George Washington University in 1972. Her doctoral dissertation was titled The hermit crabs of the genus Pagurus (Crustacea: Decapoda: Paguridae) from northwestern North America, with a partial revision of the genus. Her thesis was regarded by a fellow carcinologist as "a phenomenal work that still stands as one of the most indispensable, and beautifully illustrated single works on the taxonomy of these decapods".

Employment 

She was employed from 1957 to 1960 as a fishery biologist at the Seattle Biological Laboratory at the Bureau of Commercial Fisheries. From 1960 to 1963 she became an assistant zoologist at the Department of Oceanography at the University of Washington. She moved to Washington, D.C. in 1965 and was employed as the supervisor for invertebrates at the Smithsonian Oceanographic Sorting Center, Smithsonian Institution until 1968. From 1969 until 1973 McLaughlin worked as a research assistant, and went on to become a research associate, at the Rosenstiel School of Marine and Atmospheric Science at the University of Miami. From 1975 McLaughlin obtained a position as a research scientist and was also a courtesy professor at the Department of Biological Sciences, Florida International University. She stayed at Florida International University until 1987 when she took an unpaid position in the Shannon Point Marine Center at Western Washington University as a visiting scientist and adjunct professor. She remained at Western Washington University until her death.

Death and honours 
McLaughlin died on the 4th of April 2011 and her ashes were placed in Fidalgo Bay, Washington. The crab genus Patagurus was named in her honor in 2013. Her archives are held at the Smithsonian Institution Archives.

Selected publications

References

External links 

 Profile on Bionomia

1932 births
2011 deaths
American carcinologists
20th-century American zoologists
20th-century American women scientists
21st-century American zoologists
21st-century American women scientists
Women zoologists
University of Washington alumni
Scientists from Seattle
University of Washington faculty
Florida International University faculty
Western Washington University faculty
University of Miami people
Smithsonian Institution people
George Washington University alumni
Scientists from Bellingham, Washington
Academics from Bellingham, Washington